Kazimierz Opaliński (22 February 1890 – 6 June 1979) was a Polish stage and film actor. He appeared in more than forty films between 1936 and 1975.

Selected filmography

References

External links

1890 births
1979 deaths
Polish male film actors
Polish male stage actors
People from Przemyśl